In basketball, a steal is a "defensive action" that causes the opponent to turn the ball over. The VTB United League's steals title is awarded to the player with the highest steals per game average in a given regular season.

Steals leaders

References

External links
 VTB United League Official Website 
 VTB United League Official Website 

VTB United League statistical leaders